Lateral support may mean:

 Lateral support, a type of support (structure) to help prevent sideways movement
 Lateral and subjacent support, a legal term

See also
 Lateral (disambiguation)
 Support (disambiguation)